Ngejot refers to the Hindu ritual of giving food to neighbors as a gesture of gratitude, usually during times of celebrations or holidays. 

Ngejot is predominantly performed in the province of Bali in Indonesia. The tradition is practiced by the Balinese Hindu community. For Hindus, ngejot is held for Galungan and Nyepi. For Muslims, the tradition is practiced before Eid al-Fitr, the Muslim holiday commemorating the end of Ramadan. The Hindus give food in the form of lawar, an Indonesian pork dish. 

The ngejot tradition in India symbolizes inter-religious harmony and the brotherhood between Hindus and Muslims.

References

External links
Savemybali.blogspot.ca
Unearthingasia.com

Hindu festivals
Balinese culture
Indian culture